Vincenzo Lucchini (9 January 1925 – 21 November 1984) was a Swiss sports shooter. He competed in the trap event at the 1972 Summer Olympics.

References

External links
 

1925 births
1984 deaths
Swiss male sport shooters
Olympic shooters of Switzerland
Shooters at the 1972 Summer Olympics
Place of birth missing